SantApprentice is an animated television series in 50 episodes of 12 minutes and two 26 minute episodes created by Belgian animator Jan Van Rijsselberge and made by Alphanim (now Gaumont Animation) in 2006. The holiday series follows the adventures of Nicolas, a young orphan boy from Sydney, Australia, who is a pure of heart and believes in Santa Claus as he is Santa's Apprentice. Nicolas's job is to achieve his tasks to become full-fledged Santa.

Broadcast
It has been shown on Starz Kids and Family in the United States. As well as YTV in Canada. France, Germany, Finland, Scandinavia, Poland and some other countries in Europe as well as Latin America to continue to show this animated TV series during the holiday season. In Philippines it was aired in Christmas 2015 on ABS-CBN. From 2018-2020, SantApprentice has been shown on Amazon Prime Video. All of these dubs can be still viewed on YouTube.

Characters

Episodes
What If It's Not Me?
Nicolas' Present
A Long Night
He Doesn't Exist
Nobody's Perfect
Plumped Up for Christmas
Santa's Whim
Nicolas in Charge
The Greatest Secret
Never Happy
First Hat-Bell Exam
Garland Spray
The Secret Door
The Big Exam
Stardust
Blushing Beatrice
And Afterwards?
Snowed Under!
Memory of Christmas
Santa's Fiancée
The Infernal Goatskin
The Mobile
The Old Magician
All Those Little Details
Father Christmas
Santa Playa Club
A Real Family
The Present Monster
Santa's Surprise
Ghost of Christmas
The Unwanted Present
The Lost Bear
Grandma Nicole
The First Toy
A Test! What Test?
The Meteorite
The Reindeers' Secret
So Lucky!
Real Toys
Metal Granny
They've Changed Santa!
Elf Certificate
The Test of the Mammoth
The Melvinelf
Practical Joker
Santa's Fan
O Christmas Tree
A Present for Margaret
The Day Before Christmas (26 minute Episode)
Christmas Peeve (26 minute Episode)

See also
List of Christmas films
Santa Claus in film
French article on Wikipedia

References

External links
 
Series profile at Gaumont.
Show Info at Big Cartoon Database.

2000s French animated television series
French children's animated fantasy television series
German children's animated fantasy television series
Irish children's animated fantasy television series
Animated television series about orphans
Gaumont Animation
Christmas television series
Christmas television specials
Television series created by Jan Van Rijsselberge